Spatuloricaria fimbriata is a species of catfish in the family Loricariidae. It is native to Central America and South America, where it occurs in the basins of the Tuira River and the Magdalena River in Panama and Colombia. The species reaches 8.4 cm (3.3 inches) in standard length.

References 

Loricariini
Fish described in 1912
Catfish of South America
Freshwater fish of Colombia